Kenilworth Square is a Victorian square in the Rathgar area of Dublin 6, Ireland. It was developed by several different developers between 1858 and 1879.  Unlike the larger city squares such as Fitzwilliam Square, Kenilworth developed more organically around a central square plot of land. The houses are in a variety of different styles although all are finished in red brick. The Ordnance Survey map of 1867 shows that most plots surrounding the square had already been laid out and built upon at that stage. Development of the surrounding area had begun initially after the establishment of the township of Rathgar and Rathmines in 1847.

St Mary's College privately own the green area inside the square which they acquired in 1948. This area contains rugby pitches and a cricket pitch as well as some changing rooms.

Kenilworth bowling club was established in the square in 1892 in the back garden of Charles Eason, founder of Eason & Son at 29 and 30 Kenilworth Square. The club acquired a 25-year lease on nearby Grosvenor Square in 1909 and have remained there ever since despite retaining the Kenilworth name.

Notable residents
 Ludwig Hopf - lived at number 65

References 

Squares in Dublin (city)